The Rwandan National Time Trial Championships are held annually to decide the cycling champions in the time trial discipline, across various categories. The championship was first held in 2014, and since 2015 has included an under-23 category.

Men

U23

Women

See also
Rwandan National Road Race Championships
National road cycling championships

References

National road cycling championships
Cycle races in Rwanda
Recurring sporting events established in 2014